The Chamber of Deputies of Salta Province is the lower house of the Legislature of Salta Province, one of Argentina's 23 provinces. It is made up of 60 deputies elected in each of the 23 departments of the province.

Deputies are elected using a mixed first-past-the-post / proportional representation system, wherein the most populous departments are allocated more seats, while the smallest departments elect a single deputy. The most populous department is Capital Department, which is allocated 19 seats. Members are elected for four-year terms, and, as in the National Chamber of Deputies and most other provincial legislatures, elections are held every two years, so that half of its members are up in each election.

Alongside the Senate, the Chamber of Deputies convenes in the Legislative Palace, in the provincial capital of Salta. The building, a city landmark, is of an Italian academic style. Its construction began in 1892 and extended until 1902.

Deputies per department

Current members (2021–2023 term)

References

External links
 

Salta Province
Legislature of Salta
Government of Argentina
Salta, Deputies